Zieria tenuis is a plant in the citrus family Rutaceae and endemic to the northern inland of Queensland. It is an open, straggly shrub with wiry branches, three-part leaves and groups of nine to twelve flowers with four white or pinkish petals and four stamens. It is similar to Z. collina but has larger petals, and to Z. cytisoides which has different leaf venation and differently shaped leaflets.

Description
The lower surface of the leaflets have raised veins and the upper surface is covered with minute, star-like hairs. The flowers are arranged in groups of nine to twelve in leaf axils, the groups shorter than the leaves. There are four stamens.

Taxonomy and naming
Zieria tenuis was first formally described in 2007 by Marco Duretto and Paul Forster from a specimen collected from Agate Creek near Forsayth and the description was published in Austrobaileya. The specific epithet (tenuis) is a Latin word meaning "thin", referring to the thin flower stalk.

Distribution and habitat
This zieria occurs near Forsayth and in the White Mountains National Park in the Desert Uplands and Einasleigh Uplands bioregions.

References

tenuis
Sapindales of Australia
Flora of Queensland
Plants described in 2007
Taxa named by Marco Duretto
Taxa named by Paul Irwin Forster